Beutel is a surname.

Notable people with the surname include:

 Bill Beutel (1930–2006), American television reporter, journalist and anchor
 Hans-Dieter Beutel (1962–    ), professional tennis player
 Jens Beutel (1946–2019), German politician, mayor of Mainz
 Lothar Beutel (1902–1986), German pharmacist